Mehmet Saıp (1901 – 21 July 1974) was a Turkish artist. His work was part of the art competition at the 1932 Summer Olympics.

References

1901 births
1974 deaths
Artists from Istanbul
Olympic competitors in art competitions